Corferias is a convention center located in the city of Bogotá Colombia, between Quinta Paredes and El Recuerdo neighborhoods. It is a venue of local, national and international events. Although it was originally created only as a fair space it has also served as an important place for social activities including voting and it is used by companies and individuals for cultural events.

History

Corferias was founded on June 8, 1954 by decree 1772 as mixed capital investment between the Colombian Ministry of Foment and the Association of Medium and Small Companies (ACOPI).

On October 29, 1954 it opened its doors with the creation of the first international exposition fair that would be later called International Fair of Bogotá. In 1955 Corferias became a public limited company when ACOPI sold some of its shares to the Institute of Industrial Foment (IFI).

In 1971 the Association of Fairs of America was founded with the goal of regulating the fair-related activities in South America. Initially the association was conformed by the cities of Bogotá, Lima, Santiago de Chile, and El Salvador. Corferias assumed the presidency of said association. From 1974 to 1988 the events were increased to seven per year.

In 1989 the Chamber of Commerce of Bogotá acquired the 100% of Corferias' shares and Hernando Restrepo Londono would become its new director.

Structure
As of 2010 Corferias counts with 17 exposition pavilions. Since 2002 a room called Gran Salon is being used. It counts with a covered space of  that allows events with an audience of 6,000 people sitting and 13,000 standing up. A new pavilion is in the process of being built that will allow an even bigger audience of 10,500 people seated and 21,000 standing. It is also the city's most attended voting place during election season.

Notable events
Corferias has served as host of many cultural events throughout its history, among them they are notable:

Cultural events
International book fair of Bogotá
Handcrafts Fair Expoartesanias.
Iberoamerican Theatre festival
Colonies fair
International Fair of Bogotá
Gastronomy fair

International events

Campus Party
Latin American fair of entertainment
Andean Fair of Tabletop Games
International Fair of the Environment
International Art Fair of Bogotá
International Agro Expo.
MTV Awards
Kids Choice Awards

National events
Voting posts for the National Elections Council
Launch of the 2011 U-20 FIFA World cup

Corporate events
Home fair
Fantasy and Leisure Salon
Salon of Fashion
Leather Show
Fair of young entrepreneurs
International fair of Health
Wines Expo
Brides Expo
International Automovil Expo

See also
Convention center
List of convention and exhibition centers
Simón Bolívar Park

References

Indoor arenas in Colombia
Sports venues in Bogotá
Convention centers in Colombia
Buildings and structures in Bogotá